"Juanita Banana" is a novelty song adaptation from Mexican folk music by Tash Howard and Murray Kenton. The song, which tells the story of a Mexican banana farmer's daughter with operatic ambitions and whose chorus is an adaptation of "Caro Nome" from Giuseppe Verdi's opera Rigoletto, was originally released in the United States in 1966.

The Peels
The original release of "Juanita Banana" was performed by The Peels, a studio group assembled by co-writer Tash Howard, who also co-produced the single. The Peels consisted of Gail Allan (22), Bill Spilka (25), Harvey Davis (23), and Harold Swart Howard also wrote "Juanita Banana Part 2" for The Peels as a follow-up release later in the same year.

The record by The Peels charted on the Billboard Hot 100 peaking at #59 in 1966.

The Verdi-inspired chorus of the Peels recording was sampled later that year in the Dickie Goodman record "Batman & His Grandmother".

Other versions
Henri Salvador, Luis Aguilé, Paola Neri, Los Yaki, Quartetto Cetra and Bukasový Masív were among the many artists who recorded non-English cover versions of the song.

The song was also covered by Freddie & The Dreamers on their 1967 album ‘King Freddie & His Dreaming Knights’.

Notes

External links
The Juanita Banana phenomenon at Poparchives

Novelty songs
1966 singles
1966 songs
Songs about Mexico
Fictional Mexican people